Justice Osborne may refer to:

Charles Osborne (politician) (1760–1817), Justice of the King's Bench for Ireland
Frank I. Osborne (1853–1920), justice of the United States Court of Private Land Claims
Kenneth Osborne, Lord Osborne (born 1937), judge of the Supreme Courts of Scotland, on the High Court of Justiciary